RRIM may refer to:

Reaction injection molding 
Rubber Research Institute of Malaysia